The Maharaja's Favourite Wife is a silent adventure film directed by Max Mack and starring Gunnar Tolnæs, Fritz Kortner, and Erna Morena. Originally produced in Denmark by Nordisk Film, whose German branch was taken over during the First World War. It was released in three parts, the first two in 1917 and the third in 1921. The third part was shot at the Tempelhof Studios in Berlin, and released by the leading German company UFA. Its sets were designed by the Hungarian art director István Szirontai Lhotka.

Cast (Part III)
Gunnar Tolnæs as Maharadschah Narada
Erna Morena as Dienerin von Maharadscha Sangia
Aud Egede-Nissen as Tänzerin Ellen
Fritz Kortner as Bruder von Maharadscha Bhima
Albert Paulig as Hotelportier
Adolf Klein as Ein Maharadscha
Emil Rameau as Vater des Maharadscha
Eduard Rothauser as Theater agent Martini
Leopold von Ledebur as Theater agent

References

External links

1917 films
1921 films
Films of the German Empire
Films of the Weimar Republic
German silent feature films
Films directed by Max Mack
German adventure films
1917 adventure films
1921 adventure films
Films shot at Tempelhof Studios
UFA GmbH films
German black-and-white films
Silent adventure films
1920s German films
1910s German films